Das Bootleg – Live in Mannheim (Part 1) is the tenth album, and the third live album, by Ezio, recorded live at the Alte Feuerwache in Mannheim, Germany on 14 April 2003 and released in 2008.

Track listing

All songs written by Ezio Lunedei.

"Go" – 4.52
"Wildside" – 3.48
"Mermaid song" – 4.37
"Everybody forgets sometimes" – 4.53
"Waiting for too long"  - 6.11
"Perfect" – 4:23
"Angel song" – 5.46
"Mr Spoons" – 4.36
"One more walk round the dancefloor" – 5.34
"Take me away" – 5.05
"Cancel today" – 3.46
"Sometimes I wish" – 5:18
"The further we stretch / The cowboy song" – 15.28

See also
2008 in music

Ezio (band) albums
2008 live albums